Guyulug Mosque is an Azerbaijani mosque located in Shusha. The mosque is located on Ojaggulu street of Guyulug neighborhood of Shusha.

The exterior and interior 
Guyulug Mosque was one of the seventeen mosques functioning in Shusha by the end of the 19th century. Current exact state of the mosque is unknown.

According to the architectural composition of the main facade, the Guyulug mosque belonged to the type of Shusha quarter mosques with an eyvan with wide arches of various shapes, which constituted an organic whole with a prayer hall. According to the architectural and constructive solution of the internal space, the mosque belonged to the type of Shusha quarter mosques with a single volume and a flat wooden ceiling. In the mosque, as in other district mosques of the city, in the depths of the prayer hall, opposite the mihrab, on the second tier, a small open gallery was provided, framed by three lancet arches. This gallery was intended for women.

See also
Yukhari Govhar Agha Mosque
Ashaghi Govhar Agha Mosque
Saatli Mosque
Seyidli Mosque
Khoja Marjanli Mosque

References

External links
Karabakh Monuments

Mosques in Shusha
18th-century mosques